Elmhurst is a place in Madison County in the State of Indiana in the United States of America. It is located at latitude 40°5'52" North, longitude 85°43'17" West.

Geography of Madison County, Indiana